Diego Alberto Morales (born November 29, 1986 in Villa María, Córdoba) is an Argentine football striker playing for Cantolao.

References

External links
 
 Argentine Primera statistics at Fútbol XXI 

1986 births
Living people
Argentine footballers
Association football forwards
People from Villa María
Sportspeople from Córdoba Province, Argentina
Argentine Primera División players
Peruvian Primera División players
Campeonato Brasileiro Série A players
Saudi Professional League players
Ecuadorian Serie A players
Chacarita Juniors footballers
Club Atlético Tigre footballers
Al-Ahli Saudi FC players
Clube Náutico Capibaribe players
L.D.U. Quito footballers
Club Atlético Colón footballers
Academia Deportiva Cantolao players
Argentine expatriate footballers
Expatriate footballers in Saudi Arabia
Expatriate footballers in Brazil
Expatriate footballers in Ecuador
Expatriate footballers in Peru
Argentine expatriate sportspeople in Saudi Arabia
Argentine expatriate sportspeople in Brazil
Argentine expatriate sportspeople in Ecuador
Argentine expatriate sportspeople in Peru